Sterling Nesbitt (born March 25, 1982, in Mesa, Arizona) is an American paleontologist best known for his work on the origin and early evolutionary patterns of archosaurs. He is currently an associate professor at Virginia Tech in the Department of Geosciences.

Biography
Sterling Nesbitt received his B.A. in integrative biology with a minor in geology from the University of California Berkeley in 2004. He received his PhD from Columbia University in 2009, completing the majority of his research at the American Museum of Natural History in New York City. He subsequently held postdoctoral researcher positions at the University of Texas at Austin, the University of Washington, and the Field Museum. He is currently an associate professor in the Department of Geosciences at Virginia Tech in Blacksburg, Virginia. He is also a research associate/affiliate of the American Museum of Natural History, the Vertebrate Paleontology Lab at The University of Texas at Austin, the Virginia Museum of Natural History, the North Carolina Museum of Natural Sciences, and the National Museum of Natural History.

Nesbitt appears in the 2007 IMAX movie Dinosaurs Alive! and the re-worked 2008 version of Walking With Dinosaurs on the Discovery Channel.

Academic contributions 
Nesbitt has over 100 publications in peer-reviewed journals with over 7,700 citations (per Google Scholar) and numerous papers in high-profile scientific journals, including Current Biology, Earth-Science Reviewss, Nature, Proceedings of the National Academy of Sciences, Proceedings of the Royal Society of London B: Biological Sciences, Science, and Scientific Reports.

Below is a list of taxa that Nesbitt has contributed to naming:

References

External links
Personal website
Virginia Tech Paleobiology & Geobiology Research Group

External links 
  Dinosaurs Alive!

1982 births
Living people
American paleontologists
People associated with the American Museum of Natural History